"3 Scenes Plus a Tag from a Marriage" is the thirteenth episode of the twenty-ninth season of the American animated television series The Simpsons, and the 631st episode of the series overall. It aired in the United States on Fox on March 25, 2018. The title is a reference to the 1973 Swedish television miniseries Scenes from a Marriage.

Plot
After watching a superhero movie and on Bart and Lisa's insistent request while staying after the credits for several middle and post-credit sequences, the Simpson family returns home from Capital City. Homer and Marge start narrating the story of how they lived there before getting married, and as soon as they observe their old apartment, the couple invite the kids to visit it.

They meet the new engaged owners of the accommodation, who give Marge their mail. They continue to tell their story to the owners, explaining how Marge was a photographer working for a news company led by J.J. Gruff while Homer worked at a new company called Flashmouth. They often went partying, watching movies and watching the starry sky on top of a car, but after Bart was born, their careers and lifestyles went downhill. Homer lost his job and Marge was threatened by J.J. Gruff to be replaced by Booberella if Marge didn't get a new nightlife story.

Marge interviewed John Baldessari for an article, but Homer and Bart entered the gallery after Bart drove the car on a ferry while Homer was sleeping, and he started making pranks. When Marge presented to J.J. Gruff the photos of it, she lost her job because the journal lost their art advertisers thanks to Bart.

After Bart got banned from kindergarten class, they brought their problems to the Church. The solution that Reverend Lovejoy proposed via showing them a video called "Problem Child," which suggests that the solution to rambunctious children was to have a second child. Thus, Lisa was born.

What they demonstrate to the couple is too terrible that the soon-to-be-wife leaves the house, but the family, forcing smiles to show they are happy, bring her back.

In the final scene, the family returns to Springfield, while Lisa starts asking more stories of their background. They stop at the Doughy Dozen Bagels to eat some bagels. Homer and Marge are alone, but are disturbed by the kids moving around in the car while Grampa watches them.

Reception
Dennis Perkins of The A.V. Club gave this episode a B−, stating, "'3 Scenes Plus A Tag From A Marriage' might only be one of a handful the pair are credited with writing, but they’ve been on board The Simpsons’ ship for a long, long time. That familiarity works to pepper this episode with more than a handful of decent gags that stand on their own, regardless of whatever quibbling is left to be done over the show's timeline at this point. But it also carries a whiff of self-referential self-amusement that makes the episode feel inessential. Watching two old pros punch a clock makes for some solid laughs, but it's still not the place for groundbreaking Simpsons comedy."

"3 Scenes Plus a Tag from a Marriage" scored a 0.9 rating with a 4 share and was watched by 2.15 million people, making it Fox's highest rated show of the night.

References

External links
 

2018 American television episodes
The Simpsons (season 29) episodes